KQED may refer to:

 KQED (TV), a PBS member station in San Francisco
 KQED-FM, an NPR member station in San Francisco
 KQED Inc., the parent organization of KQED (TV) and KQED-FM

See also 

 
 WQED (disambiguation)
 QED (disambiguation)